In chemistry, particularly in biochemistry, a fatty acid is a carboxylic acid with an aliphatic chain, which is either saturated or unsaturated. Most naturally occurring fatty acids have an unbranched chain of an even number of carbon atoms, from 4 to 28. Fatty acids are a major component of the lipids (up to 70% by weight) in some species such as microalgae but in some other organisms are not found in their standalone form, but instead exist as three main classes of esters: triglycerides, phospholipids, and cholesteryl esters. In any of these forms, fatty acids are both important dietary sources of fuel for animals and important structural components for cells.

History
The concept of fatty acid (acide gras) was introduced in 1813 by Michel Eugène Chevreul, though he initially used some variant terms: graisse acide and acide huileux ("acid fat" and "oily acid").

Types of fatty acids

Fatty acids are classified in many ways: by length, by saturation vs unsaturation, by even vs odd carbon content, and by linear vs branched.

Length of fatty acids
 Short-chain fatty acids (SCFA) are fatty acids with aliphatic tails of five or fewer carbons (e.g. butyric acid).
 Medium-chain fatty acids (MCFA) are fatty acids with aliphatic tails of 6 to 12 carbons, which can form medium-chain triglycerides.
 Long-chain fatty acids (LCFA) are fatty acids with aliphatic tails of 13 to 21 carbons.
 Very long chain fatty acids (VLCFA) are fatty acids with aliphatic tails of 22 or more carbons.

Saturated fatty acids

Saturated fatty acids have no C=C double bonds. They have the formula CH(CH)COOH, for different n. An important saturated fatty acid is stearic acid (n = 16), which when neutralized with sodium hydroxide is the most common form of soap.

Unsaturated fatty acids

Unsaturated fatty acids have one or more C=C double bonds. The C=C double bonds can give either cis or trans isomers.

 cis A cis configuration means that the two hydrogen atoms adjacent to the double bond stick out on the same side of the chain. The rigidity of the double bond freezes its conformation and, in the case of the cis isomer, causes the chain to bend and restricts the conformational freedom of the fatty acid. The more double bonds the chain has in the cis configuration, the less flexibility it has. When a chain has many cis bonds, it becomes quite curved in its most accessible conformations. For example, oleic acid, with one double bond, has a "kink" in it, whereas linoleic acid, with two double bonds, has a more pronounced bend. α-Linolenic acid, with three double bonds, favors a hooked shape. The effect of this is that, in restricted environments, such as when fatty acids are part of a phospholipid in a lipid bilayer or triglycerides in lipid droplets, cis bonds limit the ability of fatty acids to be closely packed, and therefore can affect the melting temperature of the membrane or of the fat. Cis unsaturated fatty acids, however, increase cellular membrane fluidity, whereas trans unsaturated fatty acids do not.
 trans  A trans configuration, by contrast, means that the adjacent two hydrogen atoms lie on opposite sides of the chain. As a result, they do not cause the chain to bend much, and their shape is similar to straight saturated fatty acids.

In most naturally occurring unsaturated fatty acids, each double bond has three (n-3), six (n-6), or nine (n-9) carbon atoms after it, and all double bonds have a cis configuration. Most fatty acids in the trans configuration (trans fats) are not found in nature and are the result of human processing (e.g., hydrogenation). Some trans fatty acids also occur naturally in the milk and meat of ruminants (such as cattle and sheep). They are produced, by fermentation, in the rumen of these animals. They are also found in dairy products from milk of ruminants, and may be also found in breast milk of women who obtained them from their diet.

The geometric differences between the various types of unsaturated fatty acids, as well as between saturated and unsaturated fatty acids, play an important role in biological processes, and in the construction of biological structures (such as cell membranes).

Even- vs odd-chained fatty acids
Most fatty acids are even-chained, e.g. stearic (C18) and oleic (C18), meaning they are composed of an even number of carbon atoms. Some fatty acids have odd numbers of carbon atoms; they are referred to as odd-chained fatty acids (OCFA). The most common OCFA are the saturated C15 and C17 derivatives, pentadecanoic acid and heptadecanoic acid respectively, which are found in dairy products. On a molecular level, OCFAs are biosynthesized and metabolized slightly differently from the even-chained relatives.

Nomenclature

Carbon atom numbering

Most naturally occurring fatty acids have an unbranched chain of carbon atoms, with a carboxyl group (–COOH) at one end, and a methyl group (–CH3) at the other end.

The position of each carbon atom in the backbone of a fatty acid is usually indicated by counting from 1 at the −COOH end. Carbon number x is often abbreviated C-x (or sometimes Cx), with x = 1, 2, 3, etc. This is the numbering scheme recommended by the IUPAC.

Another convention uses letters of the Greek alphabet in sequence, starting with the first carbon after the carboxyl group. Thus carbon α (alpha) is C-2, carbon β (beta) is C-3, and so forth.

Although fatty acids can be of diverse lengths, in this second convention the last carbon in the chain is always labelled as ω (omega), which is the last letter in the Greek alphabet. A third numbering convention counts the carbons from that end, using the labels "ω", "ω−1", "ω−2". Alternatively, the label "ω−x" is written "n−x", where the "n" is meant to represent the number of carbons in the chain.

In either numbering scheme, the position of a double bond in a fatty acid chain is always specified by giving the label of the carbon closest to the carboxyl end. Thus, in an 18 carbon fatty acid, a double bond between C-12 (or ω−6) and C-13 (or ω−5) is said to be "at" position C-12 or ω−6. The IUPAC naming of the acid, such as "octadec-12-enoic acid" (or the more pronounceable variant "12-octadecanoic acid") is always based on the "C" numbering.

The notation Δx,y,... is traditionally used to specify a fatty acid with double bonds at positions x,y,.... (The capital Greek letter "Δ" (delta) corresponds to Roman "D", for Double bond). Thus, for example, the 20-carbon arachidonic acid is Δ5,8,11,14, meaning that it has double bonds between carbons 5 and 6, 8 and 9, 11 and 12, and 14 and 15.

In the context of human diet and fat metabolism, unsaturated fatty acids are often classified by the position of the double bond closest to the ω carbon (only), even in the case of multiple double bonds such as the essential fatty acids. Thus linoleic acid (18 carbons, Δ9,12), γ-linolenic acid (18-carbon, Δ6,9,12), and arachidonic acid (20-carbon, Δ5,8,11,14) are all classified as "ω−6" fatty acids; meaning that their formula ends with –CH=CH–––––.

Fatty acids with an odd number of carbon atoms are called odd-chain fatty acids, whereas the rest are even-chain fatty acids. The difference is relevant to gluconeogenesis.

Naming of fatty acids
The following table describes the most common systems of naming fatty acids.

Free fatty acids 
When circulating in the plasma (plasma fatty acids), not in their ester, fatty acids are known as non-esterified fatty acids (NEFAs) or free fatty acids (FFAs). FFAs are always bound to a transport protein, such as albumin.

FFAs also form from triglyceride food oils and fats by hydrolysis, contributing to the characteristic rancid odor. An analogous process happens in biodiesel with risk of part corrosion.

Production

Industrial
Fatty acids are usually produced industrially by the hydrolysis of triglycerides, with the removal of glycerol (see oleochemicals). Phospholipids represent another source. Some fatty acids are produced synthetically by hydrocarboxylation of alkenes.

By animals

In animals, fatty acids are formed from carbohydrates predominantly in the liver, adipose tissue, and the mammary glands during lactation.

Carbohydrates are converted into pyruvate by glycolysis as the first important step in the conversion of carbohydrates into fatty acids. Pyruvate is then decarboxylated to form acetyl-CoA in the mitochondrion. However, this acetyl CoA needs to be transported into cytosol where the synthesis of fatty acids occurs. This cannot occur directly. To obtain cytosolic acetyl-CoA, citrate (produced by the condensation of acetyl-CoA with oxaloacetate) is removed from the citric acid cycle and carried across the inner mitochondrial membrane into the cytosol. There it is cleaved by ATP citrate lyase into acetyl-CoA and oxaloacetate. The oxaloacetate is returned to the mitochondrion as malate. The cytosolic acetyl-CoA is carboxylated by acetyl CoA carboxylase into malonyl-CoA, the first committed step in the synthesis of fatty acids.

Malonyl-CoA is then involved in a repeating series of reactions that lengthens the growing fatty acid chain by two carbons at a time. Almost all natural fatty acids, therefore, have even numbers of carbon atoms. When synthesis is complete the free fatty acids are nearly always combined with glycerol (three fatty acids to one glycerol molecule) to form triglycerides, the main storage form of fatty acids, and thus of energy in animals. However, fatty acids are also important components of the phospholipids that form the phospholipid bilayers out of which all the membranes of the cell are constructed (the cell wall, and the membranes that enclose all the organelles within the cells, such as the nucleus, the mitochondria, endoplasmic reticulum, and the Golgi apparatus).

The "uncombined fatty acids" or "free fatty acids" found in the circulation of animals come from the breakdown (or lipolysis) of stored triglycerides. Because they are insoluble in water, these fatty acids are transported bound to plasma albumin. The levels of "free fatty acids" in the blood are limited by the availability of albumin binding sites. They can be taken up from the blood by all cells that have mitochondria (with the exception of the cells of the central nervous system). Fatty acids can only be broken down in mitochondria, by means of beta-oxidation followed by further combustion in the citric acid cycle to CO and water. Cells in the central nervous system, although they possess mitochondria, cannot take free fatty acids up from the blood, as the blood–brain barrier is impervious to most free fatty acids, excluding short-chain fatty acids and medium-chain fatty acids. These cells have to manufacture their own fatty acids from carbohydrates, as described above, in order to produce and maintain the phospholipids of their cell membranes, and those of their organelles.

Variation between animal species
Studies on the cell membranes of mammals and reptiles discovered that mammalian cell membranes are composed of a higher proportion of polyunsaturated fatty acids (DHA, omega-3 fatty acid) than reptiles. Studies on bird fatty acid composition have noted similar proportions to mammals but with 1/3rd less omega-3 fatty acids as compared to omega-6 for a given body size. This fatty acid composition results in a more fluid cell membrane but also one that is permeable to various ions ( & ), resulting in cell membranes that are more costly to maintain. This maintenance cost has been argued to be one of the key causes for the high metabolic rates and concomitant warm-bloodedness of mammals and birds. However polyunsaturation of cell membranes may also occur in response to chronic cold temperatures as well. In fish increasingly cold environments lead to increasingly high cell membrane content of both monounsaturated and polyunsaturated fatty acids, to maintain greater membrane fluidity (and functionality) at the lower temperatures.

Fatty acids in dietary fats
The following table gives the fatty acid, vitamin E and cholesterol composition of some common dietary fats.

Reactions of fatty acids
Fatty acids exhibit reactions like other carboxylic acids, i.e. they undergo esterification and acid-base reactions.

Acidity
Fatty acids do not show a great variation in their acidities, as indicated by their respective pKa. Nonanoic acid, for example, has a pK of 4.96, being only slightly weaker than acetic acid (4.76). As the chain length increases, the solubility of the fatty acids in water decreases, so that the longer-chain fatty acids have minimal effect on the pH of an aqueous solution. Near neutral pH, fatty acids exist at their conjugate bases, i.e. oleate, etc.

Solutions of fatty acids in ethanol can be titrated with sodium hydroxide solution using phenolphthalein as an indicator. This analysis is used to determine the free fatty acid content of fats; i.e., the proportion of the triglycerides that have been hydrolyzed.

Neutralization of fatty acids, one form of saponification (soap-making), is a widely practiced route to metallic soaps.

Hydrogenation and hardening
Hydrogenation of unsaturated fatty acids is widely practiced. Typical conditions involve 2.0–3.0 MPa of H pressure, 150 °C, and nickel supported on silica as a catalyst. This treatment affords saturated fatty acids. The extent of hydrogenation is indicated by the iodine number. Hydrogenated fatty acids are less prone toward rancidification. Since the saturated fatty acids are higher melting than the unsaturated precursors, the process is called hardening. Related technology is used to convert vegetable oils into margarine. The hydrogenation of triglycerides (vs fatty acids) is advantageous because the carboxylic acids degrade the nickel catalysts, affording nickel soaps. During partial hydrogenation, unsaturated fatty acids can be isomerized from cis to trans configuration.

More forcing hydrogenation, i.e. using higher pressures of H and higher temperatures, converts fatty acids into fatty alcohols. Fatty alcohols are, however, more easily produced from fatty acid esters.

In the Varrentrapp reaction certain unsaturated fatty acids are cleaved in molten alkali, a reaction which was, at one point of time, relevant to structure elucidation.

Auto-oxidation and rancidity

Unsaturated fatty acids and their esters undergo auto-oxidation, which involves replacement of a C-H bond with C-O bond. The process requires oxygen (air) and is accelerated by the presence of traces of metals, which serve as catalysts. Doubly unsaturated fatty acids are particularly prone to this reaction.  Vegetable oils resist this process to a small degree because they contain antioxidants, such as tocopherol. Fats and oils often are treated with chelating agents such as citric acid to remove the metal catalysts.

Ozonolysis
Unsaturated fatty acids are susceptible to degradation by ozone. This reaction is practiced in the production of azelaic acid ((CH)(COH)) from oleic acid.

Circulation

Digestion and intake

Short- and medium-chain fatty acids are absorbed directly into the blood via intestine capillaries and travel through the portal vein just as other absorbed nutrients do. However, long-chain fatty acids are not directly released into the intestinal capillaries. Instead they are absorbed into the fatty walls of the intestine villi and reassemble again into triglycerides. The triglycerides are coated with cholesterol and protein (protein coat) into a compound called a chylomicron.

From within the cell, the chylomicron is released into a lymphatic capillary called a lacteal, which merges into larger lymphatic vessels. It is transported via the lymphatic system and the thoracic duct up to a location near the heart (where the arteries and veins are larger). The thoracic duct empties the chylomicrons into the bloodstream via the left subclavian vein. At this point the chylomicrons can transport the triglycerides to tissues where they are stored or metabolized for energy.

Metabolism

Fatty acids are broken down to CO and water by the intra-cellular mitochondria through beta oxidation and the citric acid cycle. In the final step (oxidative phosphorylation), reactions with oxygen release a lot of energy, captured in the form of large quantities of ATP. Many cell types can use either glucose or fatty acids for this purpose, but fatty acids release more energy per gram. Fatty acids (provided either by ingestion or by drawing on triglycerides stored in fatty tissues) are distributed to cells to serve as a fuel for muscular contraction and general metabolism.

Essential fatty acids

Fatty acids that are required for good health but cannot be made in sufficient quantity from other substrates, and therefore must be obtained from food, are called essential fatty acids. There are two series of essential fatty acids: one has a double bond three carbon atoms away from the methyl end; the other has a double bond six carbon atoms away from the methyl end. Humans lack the ability to introduce double bonds in fatty acids beyond carbons 9 and 10, as counted from the carboxylic acid side. Two essential fatty acids are linoleic acid (LA) and alpha-linolenic acid (ALA). These fatty acids are widely distributed in plant oils. The human body has a limited ability to convert ALA into the longer-chain omega-3 fatty acids — eicosapentaenoic acid (EPA) and docosahexaenoic acid (DHA), which can also be obtained from fish. Omega-3 and omega-6 fatty acids are biosynthetic precursors to endocannabinoids with antinociceptive, anxiolytic, and neurogenic properties.

Distribution

Blood fatty acids adopt distinct forms in different stages in the blood circulation. They are taken in through the intestine in chylomicrons, but also exist in very low density lipoproteins (VLDL) and low density lipoproteins (LDL) after processing in the liver. In addition, when released from adipocytes, fatty acids exist in the blood as free fatty acids.

It is proposed that the blend of fatty acids exuded by mammalian skin, together with lactic acid and pyruvic acid, is distinctive and enables animals with a keen sense of smell to differentiate individuals.

Skin
The stratum corneum  the outermost layer of the epidermis  is composed of terminally differentiated and enucleated corneocytes within a lipid matrix. Together with cholesterol and ceramides, free fatty acids form a water-impermeable barrier that prevents evaporative water loss. Generally, the epidermal lipid matrix is composed of an equimolar mixture of ceramides (about 50% by weight), cholesterol (25%), and free fatty acids (15%). Saturated fatty acids 16 and 18 carbons in length are the dominant types in the epidermis, while unsaturated fatty acids and saturated fatty acids of various other lengths are also present. The relative abundance of the different fatty acids in the epidermis is dependent on the body site the skin is covering. There are also characteristic epidermal fatty acid alterations that occur in psoriasis, atopic dermatitis, and other inflammatory conditions.

Analysis

The chemical analysis of fatty acids in lipids typically begins with an interesterification step that breaks down their original esters (triglycerides, waxes, phospholipids etc.) and converts them to methyl esters, which are then separated by gas chromatography or analyzed by gas chromatography and mid-infrared spectroscopy.

Separation of unsaturated isomers is possible by silver ion complemented thin-layer chromatography. Other separation techniques include high-performance liquid chromatography (with short columns packed with silica gel with bonded phenylsulfonic acid groups whose hydrogen atoms have been exchanged for silver ions). The role of silver lies in its ability to form complexes with unsaturated compounds.

Industrial uses
Fatty acids are mainly used in the production of soap, both for cosmetic purposes and, in the case of metallic soaps, as lubricants. Fatty acids are also converted, via their methyl esters, to fatty alcohols and fatty amines, which are precursors to surfactants, detergents, and lubricants. Other applications include their use as emulsifiers, texturizing agents, wetting agents, anti-foam agents, or stabilizing agents.

Esters of fatty acids with simpler alcohols (such as methyl-, ethyl-, n-propyl-, isopropyl- and butyl esters) are used as emollients in cosmetics and other personal care products and as synthetic lubricants. Esters of fatty acids with more complex alcohols, such as sorbitol, ethylene glycol, diethylene glycol, and polyethylene glycol are consumed in food, or used for personal care and water treatment, or used as synthetic lubricants or fluids for metal working.

See also

 Fatty acid synthase
 Fatty acid synthesis
 Fatty aldehyde
 List of saturated fatty acids
 List of unsaturated fatty acids
 List of carboxylic acids
 Vegetable oil

References

External links

 Lipid Library
 Prostaglandins, Leukotrienes & Essential Fatty Acids journal
 Fatty blood acids 

 
Commodity chemicals
E-number additives